The following highways are numbered 939:

Costa Rica
 National Route 939

United States
Florida
  Florida State Road 939
Territories
  Puerto Rico Highway 939